Richard Bacon may refer to:

People
 Richard Bacon (politician) (born 1962), English Conservative politician, Member of Parliament for South Norfolk since 2001
 Richard Bacon (broadcaster) (born 1975), English television and radio presenter 
 Richard Bacon of the Bacon baronets
 Richard Mackenzie Bacon (1775–1844), English Whig journalist and musician
 Richard Noverre Bacon (1798–1884), English newspaper editor and writer

Other
 HMT Richard Bacon, a Castle class trawler of the Royal Navy

See also
 Dick Bacon, nudist or naturist from Milwaukee, Wisconsin
 Rick Bacon, Canadian volleyball player